Rock Hill Farm, also known as the Davis-Stauffer Farm Complex, is a historic home and farm and national historic district located at Montgomery Township in Franklin County, Pennsylvania. The district includes 12 contributing buildings, 2 contributing sites, and 3 contributing structures.  They are associated with three areas: the Davis-Chamber farmstead (1793 and 1875), Eliab Negley House (c. 1810), and Joseph Negley farmstead (c. 1840).  Contributing components of the Davis-Chamber farmstead include the log and frame main house (c. 1793), 18th century log smokehouse, limestone milk house (c. 1810), frame wash house (c. 1880), frame outhouse (c. 1900), frame wagon shed (c. 1900), and a frame barn with concrete sile (c. 1930).  The property also includes a stone wall (c. 1790–1820), and the archaeological remains of earlier buildings including a limestone mill dismantled about 1930.  The Eliab Negley House is a log dwelling built between 1810 and 1823.  The Joseph Negley farmstead includes a Greek Revival-style dwelling built between 1836 and 1850, with later modifications about 1900.  Also on the property are a contributing 19th century smokehouse, a frame wagon shed (c. 1900), and a large shed.

It was listed on the National Register of Historic Places in 1999.

References 

Farms on the National Register of Historic Places in Pennsylvania
Houses on the National Register of Historic Places in Pennsylvania
Historic districts on the National Register of Historic Places in Pennsylvania
Greek Revival houses in Pennsylvania
Houses in Franklin County, Pennsylvania
National Register of Historic Places in Franklin County, Pennsylvania